Elachista freyerella is a moth of the family Elachistidae that is found in all of Europe, except the Balkan Peninsula. It is also found in North America.

Description
The wingspan is .The head is dark grey, whitish-sprinkled, face
paler or whitish. Forewings are  blackish, somewhat paler-sprinkled ; an oblique fascia before middle, in male indistinct and sometimes interrupted, a tornal spot, and an opposite costal spot (appearing together to form a perpendicular interrupted fascia) whitish, in female whiter and more distinct. Hindwings are grey. The larva is pale yellowish-grey ; head black or pale brown ; 2 with two black spots

The larvae feed on bent (Agrostis species), bromes (Bromus species),  cocksfoot grasses (Dactylis species), tall fescue (Festuca arundinacea), red fescue (Festuca rubra), soft grass (Holcus), crested hair-grass (Koeleria macrantha), annual meadow grass (Poa annua), Poa badensis, wood bluegrass (Poa nemoralis), common meadow-grass (Poa pratensis), rough meadow-grass (Poa trivialis), Trisetum ciliare and Triticum. The larvae create a mine consisting of a long, flat, whitish, relatively broad corridor descending from the leaf tip. A single larva may make several mines during its lifetime. Pupation takes place outside of the mine.

References

freyerella
Leaf miners
Moths described in 1825
Moths of Europe
Moths of North America
Taxa named by Jacob Hübner